Maryam Tugambayeva (1907–1986), was a Soviet Kyrgyz politician. 

She was Chairman of the Supreme Soviet of the Kirghiz Soviet Socialist Republic in 1937. 

Her office as Chairman of the Supreme Soviet nominally made her "Head of the Republic" in 1937.

References 

 Worldwide Guide to Women in Leadership
 WOMEN IN POWER 1900-1940
 Soviet republics

1907 births
1986 deaths
Soviet politicians
Kyrgyzstani politicians
Soviet women in politics
20th-century Kyrgyzstani women politicians
20th-century Kyrgyzstani politicians